Bolgrad Glacier is the 7.4 km long and 5.7 km wide glacier on the west side of Owen Ridge in southern Sentinel Range in Ellsworth Mountains, Antarctica, situated south of Brook Glacier and north of Sirma Glacier.  It drains west-southwestwards from Mount Allen, Mount Liptak and Mount Southwick, and flows south of Krusha Peak to leave the range and join Bender Glacier east of Gilbert Spur.

The glacier is named after the Bulgarian High School of Bolgrad, a major Bulgarian education centre in Ukraine established in 1858.

Location
US mapping in 1961, updated in 1988.

See also
 List of glaciers in the Antarctic
 Glaciology

Maps
 Vinson Massif.  Scale 1:250 000 topographic map.  Reston, Virginia: US Geological Survey, 1988.
 Antarctic Digital Database (ADD). Scale 1:250000 topographic map of Antarctica. Scientific Committee on Antarctic Research (SCAR). Since 1993, regularly updated.

References
 Bulgarian Antarctic Gazetteer. Antarctic Place-names Commission. (details in Bulgarian, basic data in English)
 Bolgrad Glacier. SCAR Composite Gazetteer of Antarctica

External links
 Bolgrad Glacier. Copernix satellite image

Glaciers of Ellsworth Land
Bulgaria and the Antarctic